J. Keith Wilson is an American Asian art curator. He is the Associate Director and curator of Ancient Chinese art at the Freer Gallery of Art and Arthur M. Sackler Gallery at the Smithsonian Institution in Washington, DC. Wilson is the former chief curator of Asian art at the Los Angeles County Museum of Art (LACMA).

Wilson obtained his degree in visual arts from Williams College in 1978. He worked as a curator at the Cleveland Museum of Art. He became the curator of Far Eastern art at LACMA in 1996. Wilson became the assistant director and curator of Chinese art at the Freer Gallery of Art and Arthur M. Sackler Gallery in 2006.

References

Further reading
Work by Wilson
"Chinese Art Now at the Freer and Sackler." Arts in Asia. 41.5 (2011): 135-47.
with Michael Flecker. "Dating the Belitung Shipwreck." Shipwrecked: Tang Treasures and Monsoon Winds. Washington, D.C.: Smithsonian Institution Press (2010): 35-37.
"Korean Art Exhibitions in the U.S." Exhibiting Korean Art. Seoul: National Museum of Korea (2007). 
with Daisy Yiyou Wang. "The Early-Twentieth-Century 'Discovery' of the Xiangtangshan Caves." Echoes of the Past: The Buddhist Cave Temples of XiangtangshanChicago: University of Chicago Press, 2010: 104–129.

External links
 Smithsonian biography

Living people
American art curators
Smithsonian Institution people
Williams College alumni
Year of birth missing (living people)